DC Universe Infinite is an online service by DC Comics that launched on January 21, 2021 and primarily distributes past issues of DC-published comic books over the internet. It is a relaunch of the former DC Universe streaming service, after its video content and original programming was subsumed into HBO Max in 2020.

History

Among the features of the original DC Universe service was a rotating selection of comics published by DC. In August 2020, after DC Comics publisher Jim Lee revealed that all original programming on DC Universe would be migrated over to HBO Max, he spoke to the community aspect of DC Universe, as well as the ability to access the back catalogue of comics titles, saying "there is always going to be a need for that" and that DC was looking at ways to transform the platform so that content would not go away.

The service was relaunched as DC Universe Infinite on January 21, 2021 and became a digital comics service. Infinite would offer newly-published DC Comics titles one year (later shortened to six months) after their retail release date, early access to DC Comics' digital-first titles, exclusive comics created for the service, and access to 24,000 titles from DC's back catalog. DC Universe subscriptions were automatically transferred over to DC Universe Infinite upon its launch. In August 2022, DC Comics rebranded their online presence to be simply "DC", which in turn allowed users to have a similar user profile between DC's website and DC Universe Infinite.

Availability

At launch, DC Universe Infinite was available in the United States. It became available in Canada, Australia, and New Zealand in late March 2022, and will launch in late April 2022 in the United Kingdom. Launches in Brazil and Mexico are expected in mid-2022, with further territories to follow. The service is available on the web and iOS and Android devices.

See also
 Marvel Unlimited

References

External links
 

DC Entertainment
DC Comics
American webcomics
Webcomic syndicates
Subscription services
Internet properties established in 2021
2021 in comics